The Grassfields languages (or Wide Grassfields languages) are a branch of the Southern Bantoid languages spoken in the Western High Plateau of Cameroon and some parts of Taraba state, Nigeria. Better known Grassfields languages include the Eastern Grassfields languages Bamun, Yamba  and the Ring language, Kom, Nso, Oku, Bali, Bafut. Almost all of these languages are closely related, sharing approximately half of their vocabulary.

Classifications
The Grassfields languages were previously known as Grassfields Bantu and Semi-Bantu. They are sometimes classified on two levels, Wide Grassfields, which includes all the languages, and Narrow Grassfields, which excludes Menchum, Ambele and sometimes the Southwest Grassfields languages. These may form a group of their own, which Nurse (2003) calls Peripheral Grassfields but rejects. 

Blench (2010) notes there is little evidence for the traditional assumption that the non-Western Momo languages belong in Grassfields and that they may actually be closer to the poorly established Tivoid group; Western Momo is therefore renamed Southwest Grassfields to avoid confusion, and only Menchum and Ambele are left out of Narrow Grassfields. The classification of Amebele is unclear, though it is clearly divergent, and Menchum may be closer to the Tivoid languages (Blench 2011). Blench (2012) suggests that Western Beboid may belong in Grassfields. Blench (2010b) adds Momo as a Narrow Grassfields subgroup.

Narrow Grassfields
Ring (Ring Road)
Eastern Grassfields (Mbam–Nkam)
Momo
? Ndemli
Southwest Grassfields (previously Western Momo)
? Ambele
? Menchum (Befang)
? Western Beboid

Viti (Vötö) is unclassified Narrow Grassfields.

The Eastern Grassfields languages share nasal noun-class prefixes with the Bantu languages, which are not found in the other branches of Grassfields. However, they appear to be more closely related to the rest of Grassfields than they are to Bantu.

Names and locations (Nigeria)
Below is a list of Grassfields language names, populations, and locations (in Nigeria only) from Blench (2019).

See also
List of Proto-Grassfields reconstructions (Wiktionary)

References

External links
ComparaLex, database with Grassfields word lists
 Journal of West African Languages: Grassfields Bantu (archived on 18 August 2014)
Proto-Grassfields reconstructions

Languages of Cameroon
 
Southern Bantoid languages